Michael Sean Crees (born 7 September 1983) is a British racing driver from England currently competing in the 2022 British Touring Car Championship with CarStore Power Maxed Racing.

Racing career

A relative latecomer to racing, Crees joined the BTCC grid in 2019 after spending the previous season in the Ginetta GT4 Supercup, where he secured the Am Class title.

His debut season saw him compete for Team HARD at the wheel of a Volkswagen CC, and he secured a points scoring finish on his debut at Brands Hatch. His best result would come later in the season at Silverstone Circuit, where Crees broke into the top ten for the first time.

Having switched to BTC Racing for 2020 to drive a Honda Civic Type R, Crees would match his personal best result of ninth and was a regular points scorer as he secured the Jack Sears Trophy.

Crees re-signed with BTC Racing for a second season but the two parted company little more than a week before the opening rounds.

Instead, he signed up with Parker Revs Motorsport to contest the Porsche Supercup after Josh Webster was forced to stand down from his drive for family reasons.

Racing record

Racing career summary

Complete British Touring Car Championship results
(key) Races in bold indicate pole position (1 point awarded) Races in italics indicate fastest lap (1 point awarded all races) * signifies that driver lead race for at least one lap (1 point awarded all races)

Complete Porsche Supercup results
(key) (Races in bold indicate
Pole Position) (Races in italics indicate fastest lap)

References

External links
 https://www.michaelcreesmotorsport.com/

1983 births
Living people
British Touring Car Championship drivers
English racing drivers
British racing drivers
Britcar drivers
Ginetta GT4 Supercup drivers